Voldemar Linnamägi (4 November 1881 Tallinn –  2 January 1948) was an Estonian politician. He was a member of I Riigikogu.

References

1881 births
1948 deaths
Politicians from Tallinn
People from Kreis Harrien
christian People's Party (Estonia) politicians
Members of the Riigikogu, 1920–1923
Members of the Riigikogu, 1923–1926